Stephen Hyde (born ) is an American male cyclo-cross cyclist. He represented his nation in the 2015, 2016, 2017 and 2018 men's elite event at the UCI Cyclo-cross World Championships. He won gold medals at the Pan-American Cyclo-cross Championships in 2016 and 2017.

References

External links
 Profile at cyclingarchives.com

1987 births
Living people
Cyclo-cross cyclists
American male cyclists
Place of birth missing (living people)
American cyclo-cross champions